Kuyashkino (Quyaş) is a rural locality (a village) in Sakhayevsky Selsoviet, Karmaskalinsky District, Bashkortostan, Russia. The population was 78 as of 2010. There are 4 streets.

Geography 
Kuyashkino is located 29 km northeast of Karmaskaly (the district's administrative centre) by road. Simsky is the nearest rural locality.

References 

Rural localities in Karmaskalinsky District